The Wheel is a British television game show hosted by Michael McIntyre, mainly broadcast on Saturday evenings on BBC One.

Production 
McIntyre explained that he first thought of ideas for The Wheel while taking a bath, envisioning the idea of a "human roulette wheel". He pondered that there had been "so many talent shows" on British television, but not many "brand new" game shows.

Seeking formats that could be easily produced under COVID-19 safety protocols such as social distancing (eased by design due to its large studio set at Bovingdon Airfield in Hertfordshire), the BBC picked up The Wheel as a de facto substitute for McIntyre's variety show series Michael McIntyre's Big Show (which was not feasible to produce due to its heavy reliance on live audience participation).

Gameplay

Main game 
They face in toward the centre, below which is a secondary stage where three contestants sit in chairs on a smaller wheel. This wheel is spun to choose a contestant at random, who is lifted up in their chair to the main stage.

In each round, the contestant chooses a subject, the seat of whose expert lights up gold, and also an expert to "shut down" – the one they believe is least likely to know about it, whose seat lights up red. The wheel is then spun to choose an expert at random; if it does not stop on the "shut-down" one, the host asks a question with four multiple-choice answers. The contestant may discuss it with the expert before answering; a correct response adds £10,000 to the bank if the subject expert was spun, or £3,000 otherwise. If the contestant misses a question or spins an expert who has been shut down, their turn ends and they are lowered back onto the smaller wheel, which is spun to choose a new contestant. Since the selection is random and all three contestants are always eligible to be chosen, it is possible for the same contestant to return to the game immediately after being dismissed. Each subject remains in play until a contestant correctly answers a question in it. 

The other six experts also answer the question, using keypads to lock in their answers. If an expert misses a question in their own subject, whether or not they were spun for it, they are automatically shut down for the next round in addition to the expert chosen by the contestant. If all seven experts answer correctly (a "Perfect Wheel"), a bonus of £5,000 is added to the bank. When only one subject remains, the seats of all other experts who are not currently shut down and who have not been spun during the game turn silver, setting the question value at £6,000 if the wheel stops on any of them.

After all seven subjects have been used, the current contestant moves on to the final and has the first chance to win the bank.

Moneyspinner
Introduced in the second series, this round is played after the third question as a way to increase the bank. The host asks a question with at least seven answers (e.g. signs of the zodiac that contain the letter A), and the wheel begins to turn slowly through one complete rotation. Each expert must give an answer as they move past the pointer; the bank increases by £1,000 for each correct answer. A further £3,000 is added if all seven respond correctly, for a potential total increase of £10,000. If any expert gives an incorrect answer or fails to respond, the round ends immediately. The host announces the subject for the question at the start of this round, and the contestant decides which expert will answer first.

Final: Cashout 
The experts are ranked by how many questions they have answered correctly during the game. The contestant may choose the best, fourth-best, or worst performer to assist them; these choices respectively set the prize at 50%, 100%, or 200% of the banked total.

The wheel is spun to choose one of three new subjects, after which the host asks a question. The contestant may discuss it with the chosen expert for 30 seconds before locking in a response. A correct answer awards the money at stake to the contestant and ends the game. If the contestant misses, they are returned to the smaller wheel and a new contestant is chosen. The subject of the missed question, the expert chosen for it, and the prize associated with them are all removed from play. If the contestants miss questions with all three experts, all of them leave with nothing.

During the first two series, four subjects were available on the wheel, and those for missed questions were replaced.

The maximum potential winnings total in series 1 is £210,000, achievable by correctly answering a question in all seven subjects with the help of the respective experts, achieving a Perfect Wheel on each of those turns, and giving a correct answer in the final with the worst performer. Beginning with series 2, the maximum is £230,000, requiring a correct answer from every expert in the Moneyspinner as well. In series 3, the final is referred to by Michael McIntyre as the Cashout.

Mechanics 
The position at which the wheel stops after a spin is determined at random by a computer beforehand.

Transmissions

International versions
NBC announced in February 2021 that an American version with a ten-episode run had been ordered. It is produced by Warner Bros. Unscripted Television and Hungry McBear Media. In May 2021, it was announced that the show would premiere in the 2021–22 television season. In August 2021, an announcement was made that the show would premiere in 2022 with McIntyre as host. By May 2022 however, NBC indicated there would be a 2023 premiere, either midseason or summer. Eventually, the show premiered on December 19, 2022, with the first ten episodes airing in two weeks during the holiday season.

In May 2021, Dutch channel SBS 6 announced a local production to premiere later that year.

In November 2021, Finnish network MTV3 announced their local version would premiere next year with auditions being held as well, in 2022. In November 2022, it was announced that the version would premiere late in the next spring season.

References

External links
 
 
 

2020 British television series debuts
2020s British game shows
BBC high definition shows
BBC television game shows
English-language television shows
Television series by Hungry Bear Media